The 2022 Hy-Vee IndyCar Race Weekend was a pair of IndyCar motor races held on July 23, 2022 and July 24, 2022 at Iowa Speedway in  Newton, Iowa. They were the 11th and 12th rounds of the 2022 IndyCar season. The race weekend has been held since 2007 with a brief hiatus in 2021 after a change of focus by the owner of the track.

The first race (officially the Hy-VeeDeals.com 250 presented by DoorDash) was held on July 23, 2022. The race consisted of 250 laps and was won by Josef Newgarden.

The second race (officially the Hy-Vee Salute to Farmers 300 presented by Google) was held on July 24, 2022. The race consisted of 300 laps and was won by Patricio O'Ward.

Each race was accompanied with concerts before and after it with Tim McGraw and Florida Georgia Line on Saturday and Gwen Stefani, and Blake Shelton performing on Sunday.

Race 1 - Hy-VeeDeals.com 250 presented by DoorDash

Entry List

Practice

Qualifying 
Qualifying for Race 1 started at 10:30 AM CT on July 23, 2022. Each entrant turned two consecutive laps, with their first lap time counting towards Race 1 qualifying.

Qualifying classification

Race 
The race started at 4:06 PM ET on July 23, 2022.

Race classification

Championship standings after the race 

Drivers' Championship standings

Engine manufacturer standings

 Note: Only the top five positions are included.

Race 2 - Hy-Vee Salute to Farmers 300 presented by Google

Entry list 

The entry list for Race 2 was the same as for Race 1.

Qualifying 
Qualifying for Race 2 started at 10:30 AM CT on July 23, 2022. Each entrant turned two consecutive laps, with their second lap time counting towards Race 2 qualifying.

Qualifying classification

Race 
The race started at 3:30 PM ET on July 24, 2022.

Race classification

Championship standings after the race 

Drivers' Championship standings

Engine manufacturer standings

 Note: Only the top five positions are included.

Footnotes

References

Iowa Corn Indy 300
Hy-Vee IndyCar Race Weekend
Hy-Vee IndyCar Race Weekend
Hy-Vee IndyCar Race Weekend